Leonty Nikolayevich Gurtyev (Russian: Леонтий Николаевич Гуртьев; 1 July 1891 – 3 August 1943) was a Soviet military officer, known for his participation in the Second World War's Eastern front and most notably in the battle of Stalingrad.

Early life
Leonty Nikolayevich Gurtyev was born in the town of Shamakhi (now in Azerbaijan) in the family of a forester. In 1900, the family moved to the city of Panevėžys, in the Kovno area of modern-day Lithuania. After graduating from high school with honors, Gurtyev enrolled at the Kharkov Institute of Technology. In 1914 he was transferred to the St. Petersburg Polytechnic Institute, where he was arrested for participating in a workers' demonstration and spent three months imprisoned in the Peter and Paul Fortress.

After his release from prison he was drafted and sent to the reserve artillery division in the city of Luga, and then to the front near Warsaw, where Czarist Russia was fighting against Germany in World War I. In the fall of 1915, in a battle in the Volyn area, he was captured by Austro-Hungarian troops and remained a prisoner until November 1918. Held in captivity in Hungary, Gurtyev was liberated, along with the other prisoners, by  revolutionaries during the 1919 uprising. On returning home he volunteered in the Red Army.

Military officer
Gurtev fought in the Russian Civil War, taking part in the battle of Tsaritsyn, and rose through the Red Army officers' ranks. In 1929, he graduated from the Shot course. In 1939, he was appointed Assistant Head of the Infantry School of  Omsk. In March 1942, Colonel Gurtyev started the formation of the military unit that was to become the 308th Rifle Division and in May assumed its command.

Stalingrad
Gurtyev's Division crossed the Volga river during the night of the 30th of September 1942 and immediately engaged the enemy. They were ordered to defend the silicate plant just north of the Barikady factory. On 23 October fighting began inside the factory, with German tanks brought in and Luftwaffe aircraft bombing Soviet defences, while the attackers also used Nebelwerfer mortars for close-quarter bombing. The factory's workshops changed hands several times.

As was customary during the battle of Stalingrad, and during the Eastern Front fighting generally, the word "retreat" and its derivatives were not used in military communications from and to Gurtyev's division during its engagement with the enemy.

Gurtyev's division dug in and held on in defense of the factory, while also conducting continuous counter-attacks.

Death
Following the liberation of the city of Stalingrad, Gurtyev's division fought in the attacking operation that led to the encirclement of the German Sixth Army, the Third and Fourth Romanian armies, and portions of the German Fourth Panzer Army. 
On 7 December 1942, Gurtyev was promoted to the rank of Major General. 

Gurtyev's division fought in the extended operations around Kursk, which lasted from July through August 1943. On the 8th of August, during the battle for the recapture of Orel, a shell exploded at the officers' observation post and Gurtyev, protecting  with his body General Alexander Gorbatov, died  immediately from the shrapnel.

Awards
On 4 May 1943, Gurtyev was awarded the Order of the Red Banner. Post-humously, the Order of Lenin was awarded as well as the Order of the Red Banner for a second time. On 27 August 1943, the Soviet Presidium, citing his "exemplary performance in command assignments in battle with the German invaders and the heroism and courage displayed," awarded Gurtyev posthumously the medal of the Hero of the Soviet Union.

Notes

References

Sources

Books

Papers

Websites

1891 births
1943 deaths
Azerbaijani emigrants to the Soviet Union
Bolsheviks
Heroes of the Soviet Union
Recipients of the Order of Lenin
Recipients of the Order of the Red Banner
Russian people of World War II
Soviet military personnel killed in World War II